The Harzer Wandernadel is a system of hiking awards in the Harz mountains in central Germany.  The hiker (or mountain biker) can earn awards at different levels of challenge by walking to the various checkpoints in the network and stamping his or her passbook to record the visit. With 222 checkpoints in three federal states and across five districts in the Harz and with membership in five figures, the system has gained a following Germany-wide.

Purpose 
The idea of the Wandernadel (literally "hiking needle/pin" --> "hiking badge") is to give those holidaying in the Harz a worthwhile goal to achieve and encourage them to stay for longer or return. It also aims to encourage those who live in the local area to go hiking and improve their fitness.

In addition the system helps tourists and locals to get to know the many different sights and hiking trails in the Harz. To that end, checkpoints have been located at scenic viewing points, places of geological or botanical, culturalbor historical or  interest.With a few exceptions, the checkpoints can only be reached on foot or bicycle.

Hiking badge system 

Harz hiking badges are awarded at several levels depending on the number of checkpoints reached (verified by stamping a pass book): 

 8 stamps:  Harz hiking badge in bronze 
 16 stamps: Harz hiking badge in silver 
 24 stamps: Harz hiking badge in gold 
 50 stamps: Harz Hiking King (Wanderkönig) or Queen (Wanderkönigin)
 100 stamps: Harz Imperial Rucksack (Kaiserrucksack)
 111 stamps: Harz Mining Foreman (Steiger) (111 different control points, of which 22 are special checkpoints connected with mining in the Harz)
 150 stamps: Harz Imperial Boot (Kaiserschuh)
 222 stamps: Harz Hiking Emperor (Wanderkaiser) or Empress (Wanderkaiserin)

The awards may be earned over any period of time; there is no time limit within which the stamps have to be collected.

In addition there are special themed hiking badges that may be earned. For example there is one for collecting 11 stamps on checkpoints located on the Harzer Hexenstieg the "Harz Witch's Path". Others include a Goethe Way (Goetheweg) badge and an Inner German Border badge.

It is also possible, in addition to collecting all 222 stamps, to collect several additional special stamps that are recorded at the end of a walking pass. These special stamps are only collector's items and do not count towards any award.

Process for getting a hiking badge 

Before visiting checkpoints and starting to collect stamps, the hiker first needs to buy a hiking pass book (Wanderpass); these can be obtained cheaply online or in the tourist and spa facilities in the towns and villages of the Harz, in participating pubs within the network and in some bookshops. It is also worthwhile buying a set of 3 maps on which the checkpoints are marked, although this information can be found in other ways, including the organiser's website. The website first published its English pages in 2012 with the support of the British garrison in Hohne.

The pass must be stamped at each checkpoint. If the stamp is missing or damaged, a code number can be noted down as an alternative. This ensures that vandalism should not prevent hikers from collecting points towards their badges.

On gaining the requisite number of stamps, the pass is handed in again at a counter and the badges can be bought at little cost after the pass has been checked. The Foreman (Steiger) and Emperor (Kaiser) badges can only be obtained from the Harzer Wandernadel main office in Blankenburg, which is only open Monday to Friday during working hours.

Features 
The Harz hiking badge is significantly different from many other hiking badge systems. For example, there are hardly any other places where there is a system with as many as 222 control points crossing state and district boundaries. In addition the system is relatively well protected from vandalism and can be set up anywhere on the terrain, whilst with other systems the checkpoints are at restaurants, shops, etc., and can only be used during opening hours.

Unlike other hiking badge projects, the hassle of enrolling as a 'customer' is avoided, because the stamps may be collected freely without needing to supply anyone with a telephone number or address.

History 
The initiator and operator is the Gesund älter werden im Harz ("Aging healthily in the Harz") with its head office in Blankenburg, which is supported by various public institutions. The first checkpoints were set up in 2006; since 2007 the current system of 222 control points has been available. There are no plans to extend it, however the checkpoints are sometimes relocated to different places in the Harz.

Resonance 
The system soon gained extraordinary popularity, as can clearly be seen from the number of walkers stamping their passes at the control points. In 2009 alone about 10,000 hiking passes were sold. It is also noteworthy that in each year there has been a three-figure number of walkers that have achieved the highest award, the "Harz Hiking Emperor". (As the control points are spread across a 110 km long and 30 - 40 km wide range of low mountains, covering all of them may  take a total of several weeks spent on the trails and travelling to the trails.)

Locations 
Some of examples of checkpoints in the Harzer Wandernadel are listed below:

List of checkpoints 
The following is a list of all the checkpoints as at December 2012. They are listed by their German names used by the Harzer Wandernadel.

1 to 60 

1 - Eckertalsperre - Staumauer
2 - Scharfenstein - Rangerstation
3 - Am Kruzifix
4 - Taubenklippe
5 - Froschfelsen
6 - Oberer Ilsefälle (Bremer Hütte)
7 - Gasthaus Plessenburg
8 - Stempelsbuche
9 - Brockenhaus
10 - Große Zeterklippe
11 - Eckerloch
12 - Achtermannshöhe
13 - Ahrensklint
14 - Schnarcherklippe
15 - Leistenklippe
16 - Ferdinandstein
17 - Trudenstein
18 - Grenzweg zum Kaffeehorst
19 - Skidenkmal
20 - Barenberg (Aussichtspunkt)
21 - Helenenruh Elend 
22 - Gelber Brink
23 - Molkenhausstern
24 - Wolfsklippe
25 - Oberförster-Koch-Denkmal
26 - Mönchsbuche
27 - Ottofelsen
28 - Gasthaus Steinerne Renne
29 - Elversstein
30 - Ilsestein
31 - Agnesberg
32 - Gasthaus Christianental
33 - Stapenberg
34 - Scharfenstein
35 - Gasthaus Armeleuteberg
36 - Peterstein
37 - Büchenberg
38 - Galgenberg
39 - Tagebau Felswerke
40 - Königshütter Wasserfall
41 - Ruine Königsburg
42 - Trogfurther Brücke
43 - Wasserscheide Weser-Elbe "Hohe Tür"
44 - Kapitelsberg
45 - Dicke Tannen
46 - Grenzmuseum am Ring der Erinnerung
47 - Oberharzblick am Buchenberg
48 - Stierbergsteich
49 - Grüntal
50 - Walzenhütte
51 - Carlsturm
52 - Trageburg am Hexenstieg
53 - Hassel-Vorsperre
54 - Rotestein
55 - Wüstung Selkenfelde / Kirche
56 - Rappbodeblick Trautenstein
57 - Echowiese Allrode
58 - Pferdchen
59 - Klostergrund Michaelstein
60 - Stemberghaus - Köhlerei

61 to 120 

61 - Harzer Grauwacke Rieder
62 - Talsperre Wendefurth (Talsperrenblick)
63 - Schöneburg (Aussichtspunkt)
64 - Böser Kleef (Aussichtspunkt)
65 - Gasthaus Todtenrode
66 - Wilhelmsblick (Aussichtspunkt)
67 - Weißer Hirsch (Aussichtspunkt)
68 - Pfeil-Denkmal
69 - Sonnenklippe (Bodetal)
70 - Prinzensicht (Aussichtspunkt)
71 - Rosstrappe (Abzweig Schurre)
72 - La Viershöhe
73 - Glockenstein
74 - Hamburger Wappen (Teufelsmauer)
75 - Hahnenkleeklippen
76 - Großvaterfelsen
77 - Ruine Luisenburg
78 - Barocke Gärten
79 - Otto-Ebert-Brücke (am Herzogsweg)
80 - Burgruine Regenstein
81 - Sandhöhlen im Heers
82 - Regensteinmühle
83 - Austbergturm
84 - Altenburg (bei Heimburg)
85 - Wasserkunst Thumkuhlental
86 - Bisongehege
87 - Volkmarskeller
88 - Aussichtspavillon Hoher Kleef
89 - Schornsteinberg
90 - Roter Schuss
91 - Weltkulturerbe Rammelsberg
92 - Poppenberg mit Aussichtsturm
93 - Dreitälerblick
94 - Drei-Herren-Stein
95 - Ilfelder Wetterfahne
96 - Ehemalige Steinmühle
97 - Ziegenalm
98 - Ruine Hohnstein
99 - Komödienplatz
100 - Ebersburg
101 - Einhornhöhle
102 - Vereinsplatz
103 - Kalte Birke
104 - Tränkebachhütte
105 - Prinzenlaube
106 - Schöne Aussicht, Bielstein
107 - Maaßener Gaipel
108 - Brockenblick
109 - Heimburg
110 - Granestausee
111 - Graneblockhaus
112 - Liebesbank
113 - Grumbacher Teiche
114 - Hütte am Sidecum
115 - Bismarckturm
116 - Verlobungsinsel in der Oker
117 - Treppenstein
118 - Kästehaus
119 - Hallesche Hütte
120 - Elfenstein

121 to 180 

121 - Säperstelle
122 - Kreuz des deutschen Ostens
123 - Gaststätte Rinderstall
124 - Köte am Heidenstieg
125 - Schalker Turm
126 - Lochstein, Oberer Schalker Graben
127 - Weppner Hütte, Jägersbleeker Teich
128 - Huttaler Widerwaage
129 - Hütte im Arboretum
130 - Iberger Albertturm
131 - Kaysereiche (Schutzhütte)
132 - Schwarzenberg, Köte Brockenblick
133 - Förster-Ludwig-Platz
134 - Brander Klippe
135 - Wolfswarte
136 - Eckersprung
137 - Bärenbrucher Teich
138 - Braunseck
139 - Kuckholzklippe
140 - Eselsplatz
141 - Lasfelde Tränke
142 - Handwerkers Ruh
143 - Köte Schindelkopf
144 - Hanskühnenburg
145 - Schmidts-Denkmal
146 - Morgenbrodtshütte
147 - Pavilion Ackerblick
148 - Waidmannsruhe
149 - Kleine Oker
150 - Großer Knollen
151 - Ruine Scharzfels
152 - Knollenkreuz
153 - Schadenbeeksköpfe
154 - Dreibrodestein
155 - Rehberger Grabenhaus
156 - Wurmberg-Baude
157 - Kapellenfleck
158 - Hassenstein
159 - Stöberhai
160 - Helenenruh
161 - Stephanhütte
162 - Alte Wache
163 - Bremer Klippe
164 - Stiefmutter
165 - Wendel-Eiche
166 - Helbing-Hütte (AP Sachsenstein)
167 - Hexentanzplatz (= Ellricher Blick)
168 - Dreieckiger Pfahl
169 - Molkenhaus
170 - Rabenklippe
171 - Altarklippe
172 - Katzsohlteich
173 - Gaststätte Hirschbüchenkopf
174 - Hohnehof
175 - Schaubergwerk Glasebach
176 - Uhlenköpfe Hänichen
177 - Verlobungsurne Alexisbad
178 - Hirschgrund (am Gasthaus Königsruhe)
179 - IV. Friedrichshammer
180 - Gaststätte Selkemühle

181 to 222 

181 - Schlossmühle Ballenstedt
182 - Schirm
183 - Försterblick Gernrode
184 - Bärendenkmal
185 - Preußenturm
186 - Anhaltinischer Saalstein
187 - Lauenburg
188 - Teufelsmauer Weddersleben
189 - Große Teufelsmühle
190 - Bergrat-Müller-Teich
191 - Laubtalblick
192 - Historischer Gipsbrennofen
193 - Stahlquelle
194 - Hellergrund
195 - Köthener Hütte
196 - Bremer Teich
197 - Burgruine Anhalt
198 - Glockensteine
199 - Bismarckturm
200 - Burg Falkenstein
201 - Konradsburg
202 - Landschaftspark Degenershausen
203 - Schutzhütte am Mettenberg
204 - Selkesicht an der Ackeburg
205 - Rastplatz unterhalb des Clusberges
206 - Hahnestein
207 - Mausoleum
208 - Burgruine Grillenburg
209 - Moltkewarte (Aussichtsturm)
210 - Meilerplatz an der Kohlenstraße
211 - Kunstteich
212 - An der Queste
213 - Bauerngraben (südl. periodischer See)
214 - Heimkehle
215 - Josephshöhe (Auerberg)
216 - Hunrodeiche
217 - Dicke Buche
218 - Neustädter Talsperre
219 - Wippertalsperre (Staumauer)
220 - Schutzhütte Philippsgruß
221 - Jungfernklippe
222 - Schaubergwerk Röhrigschacht

References

External links 
 Official Harzer Wandernadel website—
 Harzer-wandernadel.de: Checkpoint list—
 Checkpoint Harzer-wandernadel.de: Checkpoint map (interactive)—

Harz 
Hiking trails in Germany
Nature conservation organisations based in Germany
Goslar (district)
Harz (district) 
Mansfeld-Südharz
Osterode (district)
Nordhausen (district)
Transport in Lower Saxony
Transport in Saxony-Anhalt
Transport in Thuringia